Catchacoma Lake is a lake located in the Kawartha Highlands of Ontario, Canada.

See also
List of lakes in Ontario

References

 National Resources Canada

Lakes of Peterborough County